Arvo Johannes Jantunen (April 29, 1929 – July 20, 2018) was a Finnish basketball player and coach who also played handball, football and pesäpallo at the national top-tier level. In basketball, Jantunen represented Tampereen Pyrintö that has retired his jersey. He also played for Finnish national team in three EuroBasket editions.

Career and personal life 

In basketball, the  Jantunen played his whole SM-sarja career for Tampereen Pyrintö. He also worked as the head coach of the team for two seasons in the 1960s. Pyrintö retired Jantunen's jersey in 2014 but per team policy allows players to use his number 5.

Jantunen had 50 caps for the Finland national basketball team and belonged to the Finnish squads in EuroBasket 1957, EuroBasket 1959 and EuroBasket 1961, placing best at 1957 (11th).

Jantunen worked as a P.E. teacher. He died in Tampere at the age of 89 on July 20 2018.

Trophies and awards

Basketball 
 Jersey #5 retired by Tampereen Pyrintö
 11th place in EuroBasket 1957, 13th in EuroBasket 1959, 14th in EuroBasket 1961
 SM-sarja silver medal in 1958

Handball 
 Finnish championship in 1959
 silver in 1954

Sources

References

External links
 

1929 births
2018 deaths
Finnish basketball coaches
Finnish footballers
Finnish male handball players
Finnish men's basketball players
Sportspeople from Tampere
Tampereen Pyrintö players

Association footballers not categorized by position